Tejaswini Sawant (born 12 September 1980) is an Indian shooter from the Maharashtrian city of Kolhapur. Her father Ravindra Sawant was an officer in the Indian Navy.

Biography
Tejaswini born to father Ravindra and mother Sunita in Kolhapur. She has two younger sisters Anuradha Pitre and Vijaymala Gavali. Her father died in February 2010. She started her practice under the coaching of Jaisingh Kusale in Kolhapur. She is training under her personal coach Kuheli Gangulee.
Tejaswini was also appointed as officer on special duty (OSD) in the sports department. Tejaswini received the Arjuna award on 29 August 2011. Tejasvini Savant got married on 11 Feb 2016 with Well known Social Figure and Builder by profession Sameer Darekar of Pune.

Career
She earned her Tokyo berth after finishing fifth in the qualifications with a score of 1171 in the final of Asian Championship. In 2010 in Munich, Sawant became the world champion in the 50m rifle prone event.

Sawant represented India at the 9th South Asian Sports Federation Games in 2004 in Islamabad where she helped India win gold medal.

2006 Commonwealth Games
She was selected to represent India at the 2006 Commonwealth Games ahead of Asian Games gold medallist Anjali Ved Pathak Bhagwat and world record holder Suma Shirur. In 2006, she won gold medals in Women's 10 m Air Rifle singles and Women's 10 m Air Rifle Pairs (with Avneet Kaur Sidhu) events at the Commonwealth Games at Melbourne.

ISSF World Cup and ISSF World Championships
Sawant won a bronze medal in 50 metre rifle three positions at the 2009 ISSF World Cup in Munich. On 8 August 2010 she became the World Champion in the 50m Rifle Prone event in Munich, Germany. She was the first Indian woman shooter to win a gold medal at the World Championships  with a world-record equalling score in the 50 m Rifle Prone event.

2010 Commonwealth Games
In the 2010 Commonwealth Games held in Delhi, Sawant won silver in Women's 50 rifle prone singles and bronze in Women's 50 m rifle prone pairs (along with Meena Kumari). She also won silver in Women's 50 m rifle 3 positions event (along with Lajjakumari Goswami) in this competition.

2018 Commonwealth Games
On 12 April 2018, Tejaswini won Silver at Women's 50m Rifle Prone Finals with a cumulative score of 618.9.

On 13 April 2018, Tejaswini won gold at the Women's 50m Rifle 3 Position Finals. She set a Games Record (GR) with total points of 457.9.

References

External links
 Biography at Melbourne Commonwealth official website

Indian female sport shooters
ISSF rifle shooters
Living people
Commonwealth Games gold medallists for India
Shooters at the 2006 Commonwealth Games
1980 births
People from Kolhapur
Sportswomen from Maharashtra
Shooters at the 2020 Summer Olympics
Olympic shooters of India
Shooters at the 2010 Commonwealth Games
Recipients of the Arjuna Award
Asian Games medalists in shooting
Shooters at the 2006 Asian Games
Shooters at the 2010 Asian Games
Commonwealth Games silver medallists for India
Commonwealth Games bronze medallists for India
Commonwealth Games medallists in shooting
21st-century Indian women
21st-century Indian people
Asian Games bronze medalists for India
Medalists at the 2006 Asian Games
Medallists at the 2006 Commonwealth Games
Medallists at the 2010 Commonwealth Games